The Family Channel is an American general entertainment television network owned by Get After It Media (formerly Luken Communications and Reach High Media Group), and based in Chattanooga, Tennessee.

History
In September 2008, ValCom announced that they would purchase the assets of Faith TV, relaunching it as a more broadly-distributed family television network. On December 15, 2008, ValCom deal to purchase Faith TV closed and they relaunched Faith TV as My Family TV. On October 1, 2009, ValCom completed the purchase of the network after making its final $250,000 payment. The network had no connections with the similarly-named  MyNetworkTV programming service, owned by Fox Television Stations.

On March 22, 2011, ValCom announced that My Family TV would become a joint venture with Luken Communications. Many of the programs seen on My Family TV, such as Route 66, Lassie, Highway to Heaven and Daniel Boone also aired on sister network RTV.

In December 2013, Luken Communications rebranded MyFamilyTV as The Family Channel. "The Family Channel" name was formerly used by the cable channel owned by Christian Broadcasting Network that became Freeform in January 2016; outside of some shared public domain programming once aired in the CBN/Family Channel era of Freeform, the two networks have no relation to each other.

Affiliates

References

External links
 

Television networks in the United States
Companies based in Chattanooga, Tennessee
Christian television networks
Religious television stations in the United States
Television channels and stations established in 2008
2008 establishments in Tennessee
American companies established in 2008